"It Gets Worse" is a single by Mindless Self Indulgence, released worldwide through Bandcamp, iTunes, and Amazon as a MP3 download on December 3, 2013.

It is the third track (Track #3) on their fifth studio album titled How I Learned to Stop Giving a Shit and Love Mindless Self Indulgence.

Music video
The lyric video for "It Gets Worse" was uploaded onto the band's YouTube account on October 13, 2013. Created by M. Dot Strange, the video projects animated lyrics of the song in front of an animated background by using samples of Jorden Haley's art made specifically for their fifth album, How I Learned to Stop Giving a Shit and Love Mindless Self Indulgence.

Track listing

2013 singles
Mindless Self Indulgence songs
2013 songs